Piotrowice  is a village in the administrative district of Gmina Zawichost, within Sandomierz County, Świętokrzyskie Voivodeship, in south-central Poland.

References

Villages in Sandomierz County